Royal Wedding Disaster is a 2016 children's novel written and illustrated by Meg Cabot and third in the series From the Notebooks of a Middle School Princess, a spinoff of the author's popular young adult fiction series, The Princess Diaries. The book was released on May 10, 2016 and follows Olivia, Princess Mia Thermopolis's biracial half sister as she gets used to her new school in Genovia and prepares for her sister's wedding. It was published April 21, 2017 in the United Kingdom as Bridesmaid-in-Training by Macmillan Children's Books.

Summary
Just a month after discovering she was a princess and moving out of the USA to live in Genovia, Olivia along with her step brother Rocky, is joining a new school, the "Royal Genovian Academy". There she meets her snobby cousin Lady Luisa and Princes Khalil and Gunther as well as all the other royals formed at the school.

Olivia is also supposed to be a junior bridesmaid at her half-sister's royal wedding. But with only a week left before the biggest event of the country nothing seem to be ready or going well. Can Olivia and her grandmother Princess Clarisse help things go as expected?

Reception
Cabot said the sequel from The Notebooks of a Middle School Princess, is The Royal Wedding Disaster. She told the group of children, “A lot of my books, I wrote by hand when I was your age. There were no laptops then.” She explained what fan fiction was and said she loved Princess Leia from Star Wars.

References

External links

 

2016 American novels
Novels by Meg Cabot
American children's novels
2016 children's books
Feiwel & Friends books